Ve Golokwati is a small town and is the capital of Afadzato South district, a district in central Volta Region of Ghana.

Geography

Location
Ve Golokwati is located between Ve Kolenu and Ve-Gbodome one of the oldest Municipal districts in Volta Region. It is located at a very strategic point. Ve-Golokwati is linked with road network to Liati (Mountain Afadzato and Afadzato falls, one of the tourist destinations in Ghana, to the west Ve-Golokwati is Hohoe, to the east is Tafi Atome Monkey Sanctuary another tourist destinations where you can see nature at its best. To the South is Kpando, where you can see the Volta Lake ( one of the biggest man made lakes in the world). The republic of Togo is not far from Ve-Golokwati with about 30 minutes drive you will find yourself in another country.

Demographics

References
FESTIVAL

Festivals In Ghana

One of the most attractive aspects of the Ghanaian culture is the colorful traditional festivals and durbars which are held yearly in all parts of the country.

These festivals reveal some common features and beliefs of our society.

Through the festivals, the people remember their ancestors and ask for their protection. Festivals are also held in order to

purify an entire Village, Community, Town, or Nation, sometime are even households.

One popular and important festival in Ghana is the "Ve Lukusi Dodoleglimeza", Celebrated by the people of "Ve" located in the

South Afadzato District of the Volta Region of Ghan

a. This festival is of a very great importance due to the historic and dramatic story

behind its celebration.

Quiz competitions are also organized among the basic schools in the area.

One of the favorite days however, is the Friday which is known as "Gligbagbe" (the wall breaking day).  It begins with the people dressed in old clothes and war-dresses, assembling in the morning at the Lukusi Gardens, a cosy shaded place at the outskirts of Deme, the seat of the paramountcy.  The various towns have their special spaces where they engage in various activities like performance of various dances like 'borborbor', 'akpi', 'adevu' and others.  People display their culinary skills in various local dishes.

Populated places in the Volta Region